RX Andromedae is a variable star in the constellation of Andromeda. Although it is classified as a dwarf nova of the Z Camelopardalis (UGZ) type, it has shown low-luminosity periods typical of VY Sculptoris stars. However, for most of the time it varies from an apparent visual magnitude of 15.1 at minimum brightness to a magnitude of 10.2 at maximum brightness, with a period of approximately 13 days.

System
RX Andromedae is a cataclysmic variable system, where a white dwarf with a mass of 0.8  and an M2 main sequence star are rotating around their center of mass. The main sequence star is overfilling its Roche lobe, so the white dwarf is stripping away matter from the companion star and accreting it through an accretion disk.

Variability
Like the Z Camelopardalis variables, RX Andromedae shows some periods of roughly constant luminosity and others where its brightness oscillates between a magnitude of 10.2 at its maximum and one of 15.1 at its minimum. However, between 1996 and 1997 it was stuck at its minimum brightness like cataclysmic variables of VY Sculptoris type, before going back to the usual behaviour. This places RX Andromedae in a transitional state between those two kind of objects. The white dwarf and its accretion disk seems to be entirely responsible for this variability, and it's driven by changes in the accretion rate of the white dwarf.

Spectrum
RX Andromedae has been extensively studied in optical and ultraviolet. It's also one of the few dwarf nova systems that have been detected at radio wavelengths.

References

External links
 AAVSO Variable Star of the Month. RX Andromedae: October 2007

Dwarf novae
Andromeda (constellation)
Andromedae, RX